Motorcycle Gang is a 1957 film which is a semi-remake of Dragstrip Girl. It was released by American International Pictures as a double feature with Sorority Girl.

Cast
Anne Neyland as Terry Lindsay
Steve Terrell as Randy
John Ashley as Nick Rogers
Carl Switzer as Speed
Raymond Hatton as Uncle Ed
Russ Bender as Lt. Joe Watson
Jean Moorhead as Marilyn
Scott Peters as Hank
Eddie Kafafian as Jack
Shirley Falls as Darlene
Aki Aleong as Cyrus Q. Wong
Wayne Taylor as Phil

Production
The film was announced in March 1957. Lance Fuller was going to star.

Filming was held up when star John Ashley was drafted into the army. It was shot during two weeks when he was on leave after basic training.

The cast also included former Our Gang star Carl Switzer.

Reception
The Los Angeles Times called it "commendably free of unhealthy sensationalism... tells its unpretentious little moral simply enough."

The Monthly Film Bulletin said the film "without being positively vicious... has its fair share of violence and unpleasantness."

Diabolique magazine claimed Ashley gave the best performance.

Legacy
Film director John Carpenter listed the movie as one of his guilty pleasures. "Good guy teen Steve Terrell vs. cool bad guy teen John Ashley on motorcycles. Anne Neyland has some trouble deciding between them. Carl (Alfalfa) Switzer is the comic relief. Russ Bender tries to help testosterone-fueled teens go straight and narrow. Very cool."

Theme Comparison

1950's motorcycle gang interest, showing the same influence of female gentleness upon aimless, male youth, may further be studied in The Wild One.

See also
 List of American films of 1957

References

External links

Review of film at Variety

1957 films
1957 drama films
Films directed by Edward L. Cahn
American auto racing films
American drama films
American International Pictures films
1950s gang films
Films scored by Albert Glasser
Outlaw biker films
Motorcycle racing films
Drag racing
1950s English-language films
1950s American films